Chang Song-rok (born 7 January 1969) is a North Korean cross-country skier. He competed in the men's 10 kilometre classical event at the 1992 Winter Olympics.

References

1969 births
Living people
North Korean male cross-country skiers
Olympic cross-country skiers of North Korea
Cross-country skiers at the 1992 Winter Olympics
Place of birth missing (living people)